Aphonopelma phasmus is a species of spider in the family Theraphosidae. It is only known from a single adult male collected near the Colorado River in the Grand Canyon National Park in Coconino County, Arizona. The female is unknown.

References

phasmus
Endemic fauna of Arizona
Spiders of the United States
Spiders described in 1940